Bill Bergson, Master Detective (original Swedish name: Mästerdetektiven Blomkvist) is a 1947 Swedish film about Kalle Blomkvist, directed by Rolf Husberg. It is based on the novel with the same name, written by Astrid Lindgren.

Cast
 Olle Johansson as Kalle Blomkvist
 Sven-Axel Carlsson as Anders Bengtsson
 Ann-Marie Skoglund as Eva-Lotta Lisander
 Bernt Callenbo as Sixten
 Ulf Törneman-Stenhammar as Benka
 Roberto Günther as Jonte

External links
 
 

1947 films
1940s Swedish-language films
Films directed by Rolf Husberg
Films based on Bill Bergson
1940s fantasy adventure films
Swedish fantasy adventure films
Swedish black-and-white films
Swedish children's films
1940s Swedish films